"Nur zu Besuch" (Just visiting) is a song by Die Toten Hosen. It's the fourth single and the eleventh track from the album Auswärtsspiel.

It is a tribute to someone who has recently died. The narrator, being at the grave at the time, expresses the sadness over it, love for the deceased and knows that in time it will go by and "the sun will shine again". The song is dedicated to Campino's mother Jennie.

Music video
The music video was directed by Olaf Heine.

In the video, Campino is sadly walking through a ghost town, till he meets another, smiling self, who slaps him to make him understand, that life isn't over, so people reappear on the streets and Campino seems to lighten up.

Track listing
 "Nur zu Besuch" (Frege, von Holst/Frege) − 4:29
 "Runaway Train Driver" (Smith/Smith) – 3:11 (T.V. Smith cover)
 "Hirnfick (Futter für die Fische)" (Brainfuck (Food for the fish)) (von Holst/Frege) – 3:17
 "Nur zu Besuch" (Instrumental) - 3:18

Charts

2002 singles
Die Toten Hosen songs
Songs written by Campino (singer)
Songs written by Andreas von Holst